Jazz Workshop Revisited is a live album by the jazz saxophonist Cannonball Adderley released on the Riverside label. Alongside Adderley, it features performances by Nat Adderley, Yusef Lateef, Joe Zawinul, Sam Jones and Louis Hayes. It was recorded at the Jazz Workshop in San Francisco on September 22 & 23, 1962

Reception
In his review in the May 9, 1963, issue of DownBeat magazine, the jazz critic Pete Welding wrote: "Spurred on by an appreciative audience present during the recording, the Adderley group has produced a collection that is both stimulating and accessible. There is plenty of good, strong blowing, and to this is added the interest of artful, well-constructed arrangements that enhance the tunes and strengthen the solos."

The AllMusic review by Scott Yanow awarded the album 4 stars, stating: "Adderley's greatest band -- a sextet with cornetist Nat Adderley, Yusef Lateef (on tenor, flute and oboe), pianist Joe Zawinul, bassist Sam Jones, and drummer Louis Hayes -- is featured on such exciting numbers as 'Jessica's Day', Jones' 'Unit 7', and 'The Jive Samba'. A special treat of this live date is hearing the leader's introductory words to several of the songs." The Penguin Guide to Jazz awarded the album 3 stars, writing that "on favourite turf in San Francisco, the band are in good fettle."

Track listing
 An opening comment or two by Cannonball... – 0:51  
 "Primitivo" (Julian "Cannonball" Adderley) – 9:13  
 "Jessica's Day" (Quincy Jones) – 6:30  
 "Marney" (Donald Byrd) – 6:52  
 Talk – 0:13  
 "Unit Seven" (Sam Jones) – 9:02 Bonus track on CD  
 Another few words... – 0:26  
 "The Jive Samba" (Nat Adderley) – 11:00  
 "Lillie" (Jones) – 4:41  
 "Mellow Bruno" (Yusef Lateef) – 6:00  
 Time to go now... really! – 0:36

Personnel
Cannonball Adderley – alto saxophone
Nat Adderley – cornet
Yusef Lateef – tenor saxophone, flute, oboe
Joe Zawinul – piano
Sam Jones – double bass
Louis Hayes – drums

References

1962 live albums
Cannonball Adderley live albums
Riverside Records live albums
Albums produced by Orrin Keepnews